The 1971 Rothmans Channel 7 Cup was a one-off WANFL-organised national club Australian rules football tournament between the leading clubs from the VFL, the SANFL and the WANFL.

The Tournament was held as a testimonial to celebrate Graham 'Polly' Farmer who was retiring at the end of the 1971 WANFL season, with the matches being played as Lightning matches of two 25 minute quarters with time-on.

Qualified Teams

2 Replaced St Kilda, the 1971 Victorian Football League Runners-Up who declined to participate.

Venues

Knockout stage

Round 1

Loser's playoffs

Semi-finals

Ranking playoffs

Rothmans Channel 7 Cup final

References

Australian rules interstate football
History of Australian rules football
Australian rules football competitions in Australia
1971 in Australian rules football